Htein Lin (born 31 December 1966) is a Burmese painter, performance artist, and activist.

Early life 
Htein Lin was born in Mezaligon, Ayeyarwady Region in Burma. From 1985, he studied for a Bachelor of Law (LLB) degree at Yangon University. Together with other students, he was expelled in 1988 for protesting about the lack of investigation into the death of another student.

Following involvement with protests, Htein Lin, together with other activists, withdrew to camps on the border with India. Here he became a member of the All Burma Students' Democratic Front (ABSDF), opposed to the Burmese military regime.  During this period, he studied with the artist Sitt Nyein Aye from Mandalay, learning about western artists such as Pablo Picasso and Vincent van Gogh. He used his skills to add illustrations the publications of the ABSDF. He was involved with internal conflicts within the ABSDF in 1991 and was imprisoned. In 1993, Htein Lin continued his law degree, which he completed in 1994.

Artistic career
Instead of working in the legal profession, Htein Lin became an artist and also an actor in comic films (as "Htein Htein") in the mid 1990s. He led the way with modern Burmese performance art. His artistic performances included The Little Worm in the Ear, in Yangon, and Guitarist in 1996.

Htein Lin spent 6½ years as a political prisoner in Burma from 1998-2004. He continued to perform for fellow inmates in prison. Officially, he was not permitted to paint while imprisoned. However, he  managed to produce several hundred paintings secretly, using white cotton prison uniforms, as well as about a thousand drawings. He bribed the prison guards to smuggle paint to him, but it was too dangerous to have a paintbrush in his cell. Instead, he used various objects that were available to him, including cigarette lighters, pieces of glass, plates, nets, razor blades, syringes, or simply his fingers and hands. He used a monoprint technique.

After his release from prison in 2004, he returned to art and performance. His May 2005 Rangoon street performance entitled Mobile Art Gallery/Mobile Market meant he was interrogated by the authorities again.

He was introduced in 2005 to the British Ambassador in Yangon, Vicky Bowman, who took receipt of his prison paintings and ensured their preservation by loaning them to  the Burma Archives Project at the International Institute of Social History  in Amsterdam. He later married Bowman and they moved to live in London for seven years.

During his time in the UK, Htein Lin undertook performance art in Trafalgar Square, central London, on 1 June 2008.

He also had exhibitions and performed in Finland, France, Norway, Thailand, Czech Republic and the United States of America. In addition, he has performed at the 2007 Venice Biennale and at festivals in Finland, Japan, Malaysia, and the Philippines. His performances draw on his artistic life as well as aiming to raise awareness of the Burmese political situation.

Htein Lin has continued to use the monoprint technique in his subsequent paintings. These draw on his Theravada Buddhist faith, Burmese symbols and traditions, his early experience as a comedian in "anyeint" satirical performances, and events such as Cyclone Nargis and the Saffron Revolution.

In 2013, Htein Lin returned to live in Rangoon, and commenced his project A Show of Hands Project. In 2014 he returned one week in prison to train prisoners to Vipassana meditation and monoprint painting techniques  In November 2015, Htein Lin campaigned in the delta area for the National League for Democracy of Aung San Suu Kyi  and his native township Ingapu.

In the aftermath of the 2021 Myanmar coup d'état, he was reportedly detained in Yangon on 24 August 2022, along with his wife Vicky Bowman, and charged with immigration offences. PEN America called for his immediate release. He was released in November 2022, as part of a mass pardon to mark National Day.

Exhibitions 
Htein Lin has exhibited at the following solo and group shows:

 Solo and group shows in France, l'Isle sur la Sorgue, 2017, 2019
 Solo and group shows in Rangoon, Burma, 1996, 1997, 2005, 2006
 Burma: Inside Out, Asia House, London, UK, July–October 2007 (prison paintings)
 Asian Attitudes (group show), National Museum, Poznań, Poland, July 2007
 Beyond Burma (group show), Chocolate Factory, London, UK, February 2008
 20 Years On, Suwunnabhumi Gallery, Chiang Mai, March 2008
 The Cell, Karin Weber Gallery, Hong Kong, March 2008
 Out Of Burma, Quest Gallery, Bath, UK, May–July 2008
 Crossings (group show), Olson Gallery, Northern Illinois University, DeKalb, Illinois, United States, August–October 2008
 00235, Carcere le Nuove, Turin, Italy, October 2008 (prison paintings)

Family 
He is married to the former British Ambassador to Myanmar, Vicky Bowman, and they have one daughter.

Legacy 
The US Embassy in Yangon has acquired two paintings by Htein Lin. Other works are held in private collections in Belgium, Hong Kong, the Netherlands, Singapore, Spain, Sweden, Thailand, the United Kingdom, and the United States.

The International Institute of Social History in Amsterdam holds Htein Lin's papers.

Bibliography

See also 
 Burmese contemporary art

References

External links 
 Htein Lin website
 Htein Lin on Facebook
 Htein Lin Performance Artist/Painter on Flickr
 Htein Lin, Artstream Myanmar
 Htein Lin: Burma Inside Out, MetaFilter
 Htein Lin (Burmese, 1966), artnet
 Interview with Burmese artist, Htein Lin by Chris Lord
 Htein Lin, The Marigold Gallery, Asian Art Gallery

1966 births
Living people
University of Yangon alumni
Burmese performance artists

Burmese painters
Burmese activists
Burmese prisoners and detainees
Prisoners and detainees of Myanmar
Burmese emigrants to England
People from Ayeyarwady Region
Buddhist artists